"The Aazadi Anthem" was the official anthem of the 2021 Kashmir Premier League, the first season of the Kashmir Premier League. It was sung by Rahat Fateh Ali Khan, who was the official singer for the 2021 KPL, and directed by Shaan Shahid. It featured former Pakistan cricketers Shahid Afridi, Wasim Akram and Imran Nazir, former squash champion Jahangir Khan, actors Mehwish Hayat, Ayesha Omer, Iman Ali, Fiza Ali, Neelam Muneer, Nadeem Baig, Afzal Khan and singer Gul Panra.

Release 
The song was released via YouTube and received over 1 million views. It was performed at the opening ceremony of the 2021 KPL. The 2021 KPL was promoted on social media by the hashtag #KheloAazadiSe, which is the chorus of the song.

References

External links 

2021 songs
Kashmir Premier League (Pakistan)